Anopina chipinquensis is a species of moth of the family Tortricidae. It is found in Nuevo León, Mexico.

References

Moths described in 2000
chipinquensis
Moths of Central America